Dyersburg is a city and the county seat of Dyer County, Tennessee, United States. The population was 16,164 at the 2020 census, down 5.72% from the 2010 census.

History

Early history
The lands that make up Dyersburg once belonged to the Chickasaw people. The final treaty by which they relinquished all of West Tennessee was signed in 1818.

19th century
The first European settlers began to arrive in the area around 1819. In 1823, the Tennessee General Assembly passed an act to establish two new counties immediately west of the Tennessee River, Dyer County being one of them. John McIver and Joel H. Dyer donated  for the new county seat, named Dyersburg, at a central location within the county known as "McIver's Bluff". In 1825, Dyer surveyed the town site into 86 lots. The first courthouse was built on the square in 1827. The current Classical Revival-style courthouse, designed by Asa Biggs in 1911, centers a downtown historic district listed in the National Register of Historic Places.

Brothers and future Texas Rangers and officers in the army of the Confederate States Ben McCulloch and Henry McCulloch settled in Dyersburg prior to moving westward to participate in the Texas Revolution. It was in the Dyersburg area they befriended Davy Crockett.

Situated as the hub of steamboat navigation on the Forked Deer River, Dyersburg grew as a river town, especially once the Grey Eagle made the first successful steamboat trip in 1836. The county's first industrial boom dates to 1879, when the steamboat Alf Stevens shipped timber from A. M. Stevens Lumber Company of Dyersburg to St. Louis, Missouri markets. The Stevens company established a large sawmill in 1880 and opened a planing mill in 1885. The Bank of Dyersburg opened in 1880, while another timber industry, Nichols & Co. Wooden Bowl Factory, began operations in 1881.

The arrival of the Newport News and Mississippi Valley Railroad in 1884 further expanded market possibilities; a branch line, the Dyersburg Northern, soon linked the county seat to Tiptonville. The new railroad links encouraged the creation of new industries and businesses. In 1884, for example, investors established the Dyersburg Oil Company, a cottonseed factory. This company remained locally important through the 20th century.

Civil War
During the Civil War, a number of skirmishes occurred in the Dyersburg area resulting in Union victories. On August 7, 1862, about 50 men of the 6th Illinois Cavalry Regiment attacked a group of Confederates about 5 miles east of Dyersburg. In a report by Brigadier General Grenville M. Dodge, he wrote the Confederates who escaped left without their clothes, arms, or horses and said that "they killed some 25 to 30 [Confederates], took 53 horses, and a large number of guns & arms." Dodge also recommended burning the county as "They pay no attention to the oath, feed and guide the rebels." He reported they were assisted in routing the Confederates by "two Negros" and that "No white man had the pluck to do it." On August 18, 1862, the 6th Illinois Cavalry Regiment attacked a small band of Confederates on the Obion River six miles from Dyersburg taking all their horses, arms, and ammunition.

On January 30, 1863, the Skirmish at Dyersburg was fought. Confederate soldiers from Dawson's Guerrilla Band spent the day skirmishing near the Forked Deer River bridge in Downtown Dyersburg with men from the Third Michigan Cavalry. Near midnight,  Union forces under the command of Colonel Oliver Wood of the 22nd Ohio Infantry Regiment located the rebel stronghold in a house near the bridge and "completely routed them [Confederates], killing 2, wounding 4, and capturing 17, when the rebels broke and fled in every direction." Nathan Bedford Forrest and Robert V. Richardson occupied Dyersburg in August 1863, until they retreated upon the arrival of Colonel Edward Hatch in the area.

20th century
Between 1909 and 1914, Dyersburg emerged as a regional railroad hub as it became the junction point for three different lines, led by the Illinois Central Railroad.

In 1916, Julius Morgan was convicted of raping Laura Sullivan of Dyersburg and became the first person to be executed by the electric chair in Tennessee.

A black man named William Thomas was lynched on March 19, 1917, for allegedly shooting an officer.

In 1942, Dyersburg Army Air Base was established by the War Department to facilitate and support military bomber training. Following the end of World War II, the base was decommissioned in 1946. A museum is currently located at the site of the former air base.

On March 5, 1963, a Piper Comanche plane carrying country singers Patsy Cline, Hawkshaw Hawkins, Cowboy Copas, and Cline's manager & pilot Randy Hughes stopped to refuel in Dyersburg. The plane crashed around 20 minutes later in inclement weather near Camden, Tennessee.

In 1990, Boss Hoss Cycles was founded by Dyersburg resident Monte Warren.

Lynching of Lation Scott
On December 2, 1917, a 24-year-old black farmhand named Lation (or Ligon) Scott was brutally lynched by a white mob before a crowd of eight thousand people. Over the course of several hours, Scott was publicly tortured. He was chained to a post in an empty lot adjacent to the town's court square. Torturers burned out his eyes with red-hot irons. When he cried out in pain, a red-hot poker was rammed down his esophagus. He was then castrated, and more hot irons placed on his feet, back, and body until "a hideous stench of burning flesh filled the Sabbath air". After being tortured, Scott was slowly burned at the stake. Scott's torture and murder occurred over a three and a half hour period. No one was prosecuted for the lynching. Author Margaret Vandiver wrote in Lethal Punishment: Lynchings and Legal Executions in the South, “The lynching of Lation Scott was the most ghastly of all those I researched.” H.L. Mitchell, future president of the Southern Tenant Farmers Union, wrote of the lynching, "The flames rose high, and the odor of burning flesh permeated the air. The black man's body sagged against the iron post and chains. Nauseated, I broke through the crowd and rushed back to the railway station where I stretched out trembling, on the cold ground." The lynching was widely reported on at the time, with Baltimore newspaper The Afro-American running the headline "TENNESSEE LYNCHING OUTRIVALS WORST GERMAN ATROCITIES" and coverage in The New York Times.
There were no more documented lynchings in Dyersburg after Scott's.

21st century
On September 17, 2003, Harold Kilpatrick Jr. took 15 hostages in a classroom at Dyersburg State Community College. Kilpatrick was killed following a nine-hour standoff with police.

In June and July 2020, multiple peaceful demonstrations were held in downtown Dyersburg around the city's Confederate Statue. These protests focused on systemic racism and police brutality. At one of the protests a speech was given about Lation Scott, a man who was brutally lynched in front of a crowd of thousands in the same court square over a hundred years prior. These events are notable as they are the first known protests to have occurred in the town. During one protest, participants were met by a group of counter-protesters concerned about the removal of Dyersburg's Confederate Statue, with some claiming the statue commemorates all Confederate soldiers in Tennessee including black ones, and claiming "Black men joined because of deprivations, like burning, raping and looting, committed by the Union". Another said Black Lives Matter was becoming "like a terrorist group." Rebuking the counter-protestors, A Dyersburg resident said, “We’re not here about the statue. We’re here to get justice for our brothers and sisters. That statue didn’t kill George Floyd. That statue didn’t kill Breonna Taylor.”

Geography
Dyersburg is located in central Dyer County.

The city's proximity to the New Madrid Seismic Zone places it at risk for future earthquakes. USGS data shows an 18.28% chance of a major earthquake within  of Dyersburg within the next 50 years. The largest earthquake within  of Dyersburg was a 4.0-magnitude event in 2005.

Climate

Demographics

2020 census

As of the 2020 United States census, there were 16,164 people, 6,865 households, and 4,500 families residing in the city.

2000 census
Dyersburg's population was estimated at 17,002 in 2013. As of the census of 2000, there were 17,452 people, 7,036 households, and 4,517 families residing in the city. The population density was 1,158.7 people per square mile (447.4/km2). There were 7,885 housing units at an average density of 523.5 per square mile (202.2/km2). The racial makeup of the city was 75.68% White, 22.02% African American, 0.21% Native American, 0.54% Asian, 0.02% Pacific Islander, 0.53% from other races, and 0.99% from two or more races. Hispanic or Latino of any race were 1.36% of the population.

There were 7,036 households, out of which 31.5% had children under the age of 18 living with them, 42.4% were married couples living together, 17.9% had a female householder with no husband present, and 35.8% were non-families. 30.9% of all households were made up of individuals, and 13.1% had someone living alone who was 65 years of age or older. The average household size was 2.39 and the average family size was 2.99.

In the city, the population was spread out, with 26.3% under the age of 18, 9.6% from 18 to 24, 27.6% from 25 to 44, 21.4% from 45 to 64, and 15.0% who were 65 years of age or older. The median age was 36 years. For every 100 females, there were 86.5 males. For every 100 females age 18 and over, there were 82.3 males. In 2013 there were 7,989 males and 9,013 Females. The median age: 37.6.

The median income for a household in the city was $28,232, and the median income for a family was $34,754. Males had a median income of $30,898 versus $21,337 for females. The per capita income for the city was $16,388. About 17.4% of families and 20.5% of the population were below the poverty line, including 29.5% of those under age 18 and 19.0% of those age 65 or over.

Sports
From 1923 to 1925, Dyersburg was home to a Minor League Baseball team known as the Dyersburg Forked Deers (1923–1924) and Dyersburg Deers (1925). They won the Kentucky–Illinois–Tennessee League championship in 1923 and 1924.

Parks and recreation
Dyersburg has several public parks, recreational centers, and swimming pools.

Education
 Dyersburg State Community College - established 1969.

Media

Newspaper
The Dyersburg State Gazette is a semi-weekly broadsheet newspaper published in Dyersburg. The newspaper has had a circulation reaching 7,900.

Infrastructure

Transportation
Dyersburg Regional Airport, KDYR, DYR by the FAA - 275 Acres
Newbern–Dyersburg station, serves the City of New Orleans route, one of two Amtrak stations in Tennessee.

Hospital
West Tennessee Healthcare Dyersburg Hospital is a Joint Commission accredited hospital. The medical center has 225 beds. Originally built as Parkview Hospital in 1956, the hospital has changed stewardship multiple times since its inception.

Notable people
John Calvin Fiser (1838-1876), was an American merchant and soldier (Colonel)
Harry Ford (actor) (1980-present), actor, starred in CBS show Code Black
James A. Gardner (First Lieutenant), recipient of the Medal of Honor, 1966.
George "Two Ton" Harris (1927-2002) (wrestler), known as "Baby Blimp", professional wrestler, National Wrestling Alliance
John D. Hunter (1968-2012), neurobiologist and the original author of Matplotlib.
Emmett Kelly, Jr. (1923-2006), "The World's Most Famous Clown" better known as "Weary Willie"
Michael Swift (1974–present), former National Football League player. Played for San Diego Chargers, Carolina Panthers, and Jacksonville Jaguars from 1997 to 2000
Henderson Edward Wright (1919-1995), former Major League Baseball pitcher, played for the Boston Braves from 1945-48, and for the Philadelphia Athletics and 1952

References

External links

 

Cities in Tennessee
Cities in Dyer County, Tennessee
County seats in Tennessee
1823 establishments in Tennessee